Lichenoconium is a genus of fungi belonging to the family Lichenoconiaceae.

The genus was circumscribed by Franz Petrak and Hans Sydow in 1927.

Species
The genus has a cosmopolitan distribution. , Species Fungorum accepts 16 species in Lichenoconium:
 Lichenoconium aeruginosum 
 Lichenoconium cargillianum 
 Lichenoconium christiansenii 
 Lichenoconium echinosporum 
 Lichenoconium edgewoodense 
 Lichenoconium erodens 
 Lichenoconium follmannii 
 Lichenoconium hawksworthii 
 Lichenoconium laevisporum 
 Lichenoconium lecanorae 
 Lichenoconium lichenicola 
 Lichenoconium parasiticum 
 Lichenoconium plectocarpoides 
 Lichenoconium pyxidatae 
 Lichenoconium reichlingii 
 Lichenoconium usneae 
 Lichenoconium xanthoriae

References

Dothideomycetes
Lichenicolous fungi
Taxa named by Franz Petrak
Taxa named by Hans Sydow
Taxa described in 1927
Dothideomycetes genera